Poranthera is a genus of flowering plant belonging to the family Phyllanthaceae first described as a genus in 1811.

It is one of eight genera in the tribe Poranthereae. Its closest relative is Pseudophyllanthus.

Poranthera is native to Australia and New Zealand. The name is derived from the Greek word, poros, "opening or pore", and the Latin word anthera, "anther".

Poranthera consists of monoecious or rarely, dioecious annual or perennial herbs. On the anthers, the line of dehiscence does not extend beyond the apex. It does not have the clearly round pores that define truly poricidal dehiscence.

Poranthera alpina has been placed in the monospecific genus Oreoporanthera by some authors, but in 2007, a molecular phylogenetic analysis of matK and ITS sequences showed this species to be embedded in Poranthera.

Species

names in Poaceae
In 1830, Rafinesque used the name Poranthera  to refer to a very different plant than that to which Rudge had already applied the name. Thus he created an illegitimate homonym. Species names coined using Rafinesque's homonym:
 Poranthera ciliata - Sorghastrum nutans 
 Poranthera nutans - Sorghastrum nutans

References

External links

 Poranthera At:Index Nominum Genericorum At: References At: NMNH Department of Botany At: Research and Collections At: Smithsonian National Museum of Natural History
 CRC World Dictionary of Plant Names: M-Q At: Google Books

Phyllanthaceae
Phyllanthaceae genera